Albertine, Princess of Anhalt-Bernburg (née Princess Albertine of Brandenburg-Schwedt; 21 April 1712 – 7 September 1750) was the second wife and consort of Victor Frederick, Prince of Anhalt-Bernburg.

Biography 
Sophie Friederike Albertine of Bradenburg-Schwedt was born in Berlin on 21 April 1712 as the third daughter of Prince Albert Frederick of Prussia, Margrave of Brandenburg-Schwedt and Princess Maria Dorothea Kettler of Courland. Her mother was a daughter of Frederick Casimir Kettler, Duke of Courland and Semigallia and Countess Sophie Amalie of Nassau-Siegen. Her paternal grandparents were Frederick William, Elector of Brandenburg and Dorothea of Schleswig-Holstein-Sonderburg-Glücksburg.

On 22 May 1733 she married Victor Frederick, Prince of Anhalt-Bernburg in Potsdam, becoming the Princess Consort of Anhalt-Bernburg. She was his second wife. His first wife, Princess Louise of Anhalt-Dessau, had died the year before. Albertine and Victor Frederick had five children:

 Frederick Albert, Prince of Anhalt-Bernburg (1735 - 1796)
 Charlotte Wilhelmine, Princess of Schwarzburg-Sondershausen (1737 - 1777)
 Princess Marie Karoline of Anhalt-Bernburg (1739 - 1739)
 Friederike August Sophie, Princess of Anhalt-Zerbst (1744 - 1827)
 Christine Elisabeth Albertine, Princess of Schwarzburg-Sondershausen (1746 - 1823)

She died on 7 September 1750 in Bernburg. She was buried in the crypt of the Castle Church of St. Aegidien.

References 

1712 births
1750 deaths
House of Hohenzollern
Margravines of Brandenburg-Schwedt
Princesses of Anhalt-Bernburg
Prussian princesses
Burials at Schlosskirche St. Aegidien (Bernburg)